David Whitefield (6 September 1936 – 3 January 2014) was a South African cricketer. He played eleven first-class matches for Western Province between 1960 and 1965.

References

External links
 

1936 births
2014 deaths
South African cricketers
Western Province cricketers
Cricketers from Cape Town